Teresa Duffy (born 16 July 1969) is an Irish long-distance runner. In 2001, she competed in the women's marathon at the 2001 World Championships in Athletics held in Edmonton, Alberta, Canada. She finished in 39th place.

References

External links 
 

Living people
1969 births
Place of birth missing (living people)
Irish female long-distance runners
Irish female marathon runners
World Athletics Championships athletes for Ireland